Breakthrough is the first studio album by American alternative-hip hop producer The Gaslamp Killer. It was released on Brainfeeder on September 17, 2012. The album features guest appearances from Gonjasufi, Daedelus, and Samiyam, among others.

Background and recording
While The Gaslamp Killer's earlier work was characterized by a heavy use of samples, on Breakthrough he chose to work with musicians to recreate the "vibe" of particular tracks. Comparing his method to the way that Led Zeppelin and The Rolling Stones used blues music, he said, "I'm just trying to get ideas from world music, different rock 'n' roll records, library records, psychedelic shit, jazz – getting ideas from other records and trying to recreate them with musicians."

Critical reception
At Metacritic, which assigns a weighted average score out of 100 to reviews from mainstream critics, Breakthrough received an average score of 66% based on 18 reviews, indicating "generally favorable reviews".

Track listing

Charts

References

External links
 

2012 debut albums
Brainfeeder albums
The Gaslamp Killer albums
Instrumental hip hop albums
Electronic albums by American artists